Briana Carly Binch (born 18 June 1987) is a former Australian cricketer. A right-arm medium bowler, she played 57 List A matches for English side Middlesex (2007) and her home state Victoria (2008/09–2015/16). She also played T20 cricket for Victoria, and took the most wickets (54) for her state in the now-defunct Australian Women's Twenty20 Cup. During the 2015–16 Women's Big Bash League season, Binch played 13 matches for the Melbourne Renegades, taking nine wickets.

Binch was born in Carlton, a suburb of Melbourne, Victoria. As of 2021, Binch is vice-president of the World Indoor Cricket Federation (WICF).

References

External links
 
 

1987 births
Living people
Australian cricketers
Australian women cricketers
Australian expatriate cricketers in the United Kingdom
Australian expatriate sportspeople in England
Cricketers from Melbourne
Melbourne Renegades (WBBL) cricketers
Middlesex women cricketers
Sportswomen from Victoria (Australia)
Victoria women cricketers